Barbareño is one of the Chumashan languages, a group of Native American languages spoken almost exclusively in the area of Santa Barbara, California. The closely-related Ineseño may have been a dialect of the same language. A dialect of the Barbareño language was also "spoken at San Emigdio near Buena Vista Lake" in the southern Central Valley. This dialect, called Emigdiano, "was heavily influenced by Buena Vista Yokuts." Barbareño lost its last known native speaker in 1965 with the death of Mary Yee. Both Barbareño and Ineseño are currently undergoing processes of language revitalization.

Language revitalization 
As of 2013, the Barbareno Chumash Council is engaged in ongoing efforts to revive the language. Two of its members are language apprentices and teachers.
Wishtoyo Chumash Village, in Malibu, California, announced the opening of its Šmuwič Language School in 2010.

Phonology

Consonants

Vowels

References

Further reading

 Applegate, Richard. (1972). Ineseño Chumash Grammar. (Doctoral dissertation, University of California, Berkeley).
 Beeler, M. S. 1976. Barbareno Chumash: a farrago. In Langdon, Margaret and Silver, Shirley, eds. Hokan Studies: Papers from the 1st Conference on Hokan Languages held in San Diego, California April 23–25, 1970, pp. 251–270. The Hague: Mouton.
 Wash, Suzanne. (1995). Productive Reduplication in Barbareño Chumash. (Master's thesis, University of California, Santa Barbara; 210 + x pp.)
 Wash, Suzanne. (2001). Adverbial Clauses in Barbareño Chumash Narrative Discourse. (Doctoral dissertation, University of California, Santa Barbara; 569 + xxii pp.)

External links
 Barbareño language overview at the Survey of California and Other Indian Languages

Chumash Barbareño, Smithsonian Archives
 Barbareño Chumash Names for the Body
 Samala Chumash Language Tutorial
 OLAC resources in and about the Barbareño language
 OLAC resources in and about the Ineseño language
 Ineseño basic lexicon at the Global Lexicostatistical Database

Chumashan languages
Indigenous languages of California
Extinct languages of North America
Native American language revitalization
History of Santa Barbara County, California
Languages extinct in the 1960s
1960s disestablishments in California